The Margaret Donoghoe Sportsground (currently known by naming rights as Aulich Park, previously Allinsure Park and Dairy Farmers Park) is a sports facility in Queanbeyan, New South Wales, Australia. It is situated in the town of Karabar.

History and facilities 
Since 1979, the Queanbeyan Tigers Football Club has been located at Aulich Park and supporters have raised $800,000 (in addition to grants from the Tigers Licensed Club) to install facilities such as a roofed grandstand, Interchange and Coaches Boxes for home and visiting teams, an Administration Building, ground lighting, a Hall of Fame walk, canteen, goal netting, scoreboards and disabled access.

References

External links 
 Queanbeyan Football Club website
 Queanbeyan history at Australian Football.com
 Queanbeyan Australian Football at Sporting Pulse
 Home Ground-Dairy Farmers Park
 Tigers Juniors Club
 Tigers Licensed Club

Australian rules football grounds
Sports venues in New South Wales
North East Australian Football League grounds